If Paris Were Told to Us is a 1956 French historical film directed and written by Sacha Guitry. The admissions in France were 2,813,682 people.

Principal cast
Françoise Arnoul as  Duchesse de L... 
Jeanne Boitel as  Mme Geoffrin / Sarah Bernhardt
Gilbert Bokanowski as  Louis XVI 
Julien Carette as  Un cocher 
Danielle Darrieux as  Agnès Sorel 
Sophie Desmarets as  Rose Bertin 
Clément Duhour as  Aristide Bruant 
Sacha Guitry as  Louis XI 
Odette Joyeux as  La Passementiere 
Robert Lamoureux as  Latude 
Jacques Dumesnil as Cardinal Richelieu 
Pierre Larquey as  Pierre Broussel 
Jean Marais as  François Ier 
Jean Martinelli as  Henri IV / Firmin 
Lana Marconi as  La reine Marie-Antoinette 
Michèle Morgan as  Gabrielle d'Estrées 
Jean Parédès as  Un médecin 
Giselle Pascal as  Comtesse de G... 
Gérard Philipe as  Le Trouvère
Odile Rodin as the Princess of Essling
 Claude Sylvain as Catherine de Médicis jeune

References

External links

Si Paris nous était conté at filmsdefrance.com

1956 films
Films set in Paris
French historical films
Films set in the 15th century
Films set in the 16th century
Films set in the 17th century
Films set in the 18th century
Films set in the 19th century
Films directed by Sacha Guitry
Cultural depictions of Sarah Bernhardt
Cultural depictions of Louis XVI
Cultural depictions of Marie Antoinette
Cultural depictions of Cardinal Richelieu
1950s French films
1950s historical films